The Dalyell Baronetcy in the Baronetage of Nova Scotia was created 7 November 1685 for a Scottish General, Thomas Dalyell of the Binns.  The succession of the title is unusual in that, in default of heirs male, it can pass by special remainder to tailzie succeeding him in the estate of The Binns.

The current baronet is Sir Gordon Wheatley Dalyell of the Binns, 12th Baronet. He inherited the title from his father, better known as the former politician Tam Dalyell in 2017.

Dalyell of the Binns, Linlithgow (1685)
Sir Thomas Dalyell of the Binns, 1st Baronet (died )
Sir Thomas Dalyell of the Binns, 2nd Baronet (died 1719), dormant
Sir James Dalyell of the Binns, 3rd Baronet (c. 1690–1747), claimed between 1723 and 1728
Sir Robert Dalyell of the Binns, 4th Baronet (died 1791)
Sir James Dalyell of the Binns, 5th Baronet (1774–1841)
Sir John Graham Dalyell of the Binns, 6th Baronet (c. 1775–1851)
Sir William Cunningham Dalyell of the Binns, 7th Baronet (1787–1865)
Sir Robert Alexander Osborne Dalyell of the Binns, 8th Baronet (1821–1886), dormant
His sister, Elizabeth Grace Cornwall-Dalyell, (died 1913) inherited the Binns, but not the baronetcy
Sir James Bruce Wilkie-Dalyell of the Binns, 9th Baronet (1867–1935), cousin of the above, as son of Harriet Wilkie, née Dalyell, aunt; claimed 1914, dormant
Dame Eleanor Isabel "Nora" Dalyell, de jure 10th Baronetess (1895–1972), daughter of preceding
Sir Thomas "Tam" Dalyell of the Binns, 11th Baronet (1932–2017), claimed 1973, son of preceding
Sir Gordon Wheatley Dalyell of the Binns, 12th Baronet (born 1965), son of preceding

The heir apparent is the present holder's son, Matthew Thomas Dalyell (born 2001).

References
https://web.archive.org/web/20150306051137/http://www.baronetage.org/official-roll-of-the-baronets/

Dalyell
Dalyell
1685 establishments in Nova Scotia